Herman "Trigger" Alpert (September 3, 1916 – December 21, 2013) was an American jazz bassist from Indianapolis, Indiana.

Music career
A native of Indianapolis, Alpert attended Indiana University, where he studied music. Soon after, he played with guitarist Alvino Rey in New York City, then toured with the Glenn Miller band in the early 1940s. Alpert's enthusiastic playing style is on display during a performance of In the Mood in Sun Valley Serenade (1941).

During the rest of the decade, he worked with Louis Armstrong, Roy Eldridge, Ella Fitzgerald,  Bud Freeman, Woody Herman, Jerry Jerome, Bernie Leighton, Ray McKinley, Frank Sinatra, and Muggsy Spanier. In the 1950s and early 1960s, he recorded as a sideman with Don Elliott, Coleman Hawkins, Gene Krupa, Mundell Lowe, Buddy Rich, Artie Shaw, and the Sauter-Finegan Orchestra. Alpert's only album as a leader was Trigger Happy (Riverside, 1956), which he recorded with  Al Cohn,  Urbie Green,  Tony Scott, Ed Shaughnessy, Zoot Sims, and Joe Wilder.

He was a member of the CBS Orchestra with a rhythm section of Hank Jones, Sonny Igoe, and Chuck Wayne until the late 1960s. He was with the CBS band for the television series the Garry Moore Show with Carol Burnett and with Barbra Streisand for the television specials My Name Is Barbra and Color Me Barbra.

Alpert wrote two instructional books: Walking the Bass (1958) and the Electric Bass (1968).

In 1970 he made his longtime interest in portrait photography a full-time profession. He died on December 21, 2013, at an assisted living facility in Jacksonville Beach, Florida.

Discography

As leader
 Trigger Happy! (Riverside, 1956)

As sideman
With Coleman Hawkins
 The Hawk Talks (Decca, 1952–53 [1955])

With Mundell Lowe
 The Mundell Lowe Quartet (Riverside, 1955)
 Guitar Moods (Riverside, 1956)
 New Music of Alec Wilder (Riverside, 1956)

With Glenn Miller
 1987 Major Glenn Miller & the Army Air Force Band (1943–1944)
 1992 Moon Dreams
 1995 In True Stereo
 1996 1935–1942
 1996 We're Still in Love

With Ella Fitzgerald
 1993 75th Birthday Celebration
 1994 The War Years
 2003 How High the Moon
 2011 The Complete Masters 1935–55
 2004 Ella and Satchmo

With Buddy Rich
 1988 Gene Krupa & Buddy Rich
 1991 Buddy Rich & His Legendary '47–'48 Orchestra
 2008 Quiet Riot

With others
 1955 Swingin' 30s Ray McKinley
 1999 1945–1947, Roy Eldridge
 1992 Doc Severinsen and Friends, Doc Severinsen
 1998 1944–1946, Muggsy Spanier
 1998 Swingin' with the Eel, Bud Freeman
 1999 1946–1947, Johnny Guarnieri
 1999 East Coast Sounds, Zoot Sims
 2001 1927–1946: His Best Recordings, Frankie Trumbauer
 2003 1944–1952, Budd Johnson
 2003 1947–1950, Pearl Bailey
 2003 Jazz!!!, Frank Sinatra
 2003 Piano Prodigy, Mel Powell
 2004 By Arrangement, Billy May
 2006 1951–1954, Artie Shaw
 2007 Always, Ralph Flanagan

References

External links

1916 births
2013 deaths
Musicians from Indianapolis
American jazz bass guitarists
American male bass guitarists
Riverside Records artists
People from Jacksonville Beach, Florida
20th-century American bass guitarists
20th-century American male musicians
American male jazz musicians
Glenn Miller Orchestra members